The 1979–80 Scottish Premier Division season was won by Aberdeen, one point ahead of Celtic. Dundee and Hibernian were relegated. St Mirren's 3rd place was their highest finishing position in the league since the 1892-93 season.

Table

Results

Matches 1–18
During matches 1–18 each team plays every other team twice (home and away).

Matches 19–36

References
1979–80 Scottish Premier Division – Statto

Scottish Premier Division seasons
1979–80 Scottish Football League
Scot